In geometry, the twin circles are two special circles associated with an arbelos.

These circles first appeared in the Book of Lemmas, which showed (Proposition V) that the two circles are congruent.
Thābit ibn Qurra, who translated this book into Arabic,  attributed it to Greek mathematician Archimedes. Based on this claim the twin circles, and several other circles in the Arbelos congruent to them, have also been called Archimedes's circles. However, this attribution has been questioned by later scholarship.

Construction

Let  be the point where the larger semicircle intercepts the line perpendicular to the  through the point . The segment  divides the arbelos in two parts. The twin circles are the two circles inscribed in these parts, each tangent to one of the two smaller semicircles, to the segment , and to the largest semicircle.

Each of the two circles is uniquely determined by its three tangencies.  Constructing it is a special case of the Problem of Apollonius.

Alternative approaches to constructing two circles congruent to the twin circles have also been found. These circles have also been called Archimedean circles. They include the Bankoff circle, Schoch circles, and Woo circles.

Properties
Let a and b be the diameters of two inner semicircles, so that the outer semicircle has diameter a + b.  The diameter of each twin circle is then

The smallest circle that encloses both twin circles has the same area as the arbelos.

See also
 Schoch line

References

Arbelos